Tsakonian may refer to:

 Tsakonians
 Tsakonian language